Melamed is a Hebrew surname. "Melamed" translates to "teacher" in the Hebrew language and came into different languages in different spellings, e.g. Malamud, Malamed, Melamid, etc.

Some variants of the spelling should not be confused with "Malamute" or "Malemute".

Those with the surname include:

 Abraham Melamed, former member of Knesset from National Religious Party
 Douglas Melamed, American legal scholar
 Fred Melamed, American actor and writer
 Guy Melamed, Israeli soccer defender
 Leo Melamed, former chairman of the Chicago Mercantile Exchange and executive in the field of global derivatives
 Rabbi Meir Melamed, financier to King Ferdinand and Queen Isabella of Spain in the house of Arbarbanel during the Jewish Inquisition in 1492
 Tatiana Melamed, Ukrainian and German chess grandmaster
 Vince Melamed, American keyboardist and songwriter
 Yitzhak Y. Melamed, Israeli-American philosopher 
 Rabbi Zalman Baruch Melamed, the rosh yeshiva of the Beit El yeshiva in Beit El

Jewish surnames
Hebrew-language surnames